Gilberto Eind (born 3 October 1983) is a Surinamese professional footballer who plays as a centre-back for SVB Eerste Divisie club Broki.

International career

Eind played for Suriname from 2014 to 2017. His debut was against Bonaire on 5 September 2014. He was at one point the captain of the team.

Honours 
WBC

 SVB Hoofdklasse: 2008–09
 SVB Cup: 2008–09, 2012–13
 Suriname President's Cup: 2006, 2009

Nishan 42

 Suriname President's Cup: 2015

Robinhood

 SVB Eerste Divisie: 2017–18
 SVB Cup: 2017–18
 Suriname President's Cup: 2016, 2018

References

External links

Caribbean football database profile

1983 births
Living people
Surinamese footballers
Sportspeople from Paramaribo
Association football defenders
S.V. Walking Boyz Company players
S.V. Excelsior players
S.V. Robinhood players

S.V. Broki players
SVB Eerste Divisie players
Suriname international footballers